The high-temperature test reactor (HTTR) is a graphite-moderated gas-cooled research reactor in Ōarai, Ibaraki, Japan operated by the Japan Atomic Energy Agency. It uses long hexagonal fuel assemblies, unlike the competing pebble bed reactor designs.

HTTR first reached its full design power of 30 MW (thermal) in 1999. Other tests have shown that the core can reach temperatures sufficient for hydrogen production via the sulfur-iodine cycle.

Technical details
The fuel is uranium oxide (enriched to an average of about 6%).

See also
Very-high-temperature reactor
Hydrogen economy

External links
 HTTR at the JAEA website.

Graphite moderated reactors
Nuclear technology in Japan
Ōarai, Ibaraki